Roman Procházka (born 14 March 1989) is a Slovak footballer who plays for Spartak Trnava as a midfielder.

Club career

Spartak Trnava
Procházka began his career with his hometown club Spartak Trnava. On 13 May 2007, he made his debut for Spartak first team against Eldus Močenok at the age of 18.

Levski Sofia
Procházka signed with Bulgarian side Levski Sofia on 14 June 2012 on a three-year deal. He made his debut for Levski on 19 July, in a 1–0 home win over FK Sarajevo in a UEFA Europa League match. He made his Bulgarian A Group debut on 11 August, starting in a 1–0 home win over Chernomorets Burgas. Procházka made only 16 league starts throughout his first season with Levski.

Spartak Trnava (loan)
On 19 June 2013, Procházka was loaned to his previous club Spartak Trnava on a season-long deal.

Return to Levski
In June 2014, Procházka returned to Levski. After a successful pre-season with the Blues, he was included in Pepe Murcia's squad for the campaign. On 2 August 2014, Procházka scored his debut goal for Levski in a 1–0 win against Lokomotiv Sofia at Georgi Asparuhov Stadium. During the season he became an integral part of the team.

On 18 June 2015, Procházka signed a one-year contract extension, keeping him at Levski until 2016. In July, he was announced as the vice captain. He was given the captain's armband in Levski's first game of the 2015–16 season against Botev Plovdiv. Procházka signed a two-and-a-half-year extension to his current contract with Levski on 30 November 2015, keeping him in the club until 31 December 2018. By 2017 he became one of the key players for Levski, by scoring numerous goals and assists for the team, making him one of the most loved players by the fans for the second decade of the 21st century. On 1 October 2017, Procházka played in the 1:0 home win over Cherno More, becoming the foreign player with the most top division appearances for Levski Sofia.

Viktoria Plzeň
On 29 May 2018, Procházka was signed for free by Czech club Viktoria Plzeň after his contract with Levski expired and was not renewed. Most of the time during his stay with Plzeň Procházka played as a stabile member of the starting eleven. He also played in five of their six Champions League group stage matches in their 2018–19 european campaign. Onn 27 November, he also scored his only Champions League goal against CSKA Moscow. In the spring he also played in both Europa League Round of 32 matches against Dinamo Zagreb. 

In late January 2020, Plzeň's new coach Adrián Guľa told Procházka that he is going to give space to the other players. He also said that Procházka will only be his fourth of fifth midfield choice and he got permission to find himself a new club.

Górnik Zabrze
On 27 January 2020, Procházka signed a one-and-a-half year deal with Polish side Górnik Zabrze.

International career
Procházka made his debut for Slovakia in the 2–1 away win against Austria on 10 August 2011. He came on as a substitute for Juraj Kucka in 79th minute.

Statistics
As of 12 May 2018

Honours
Spartak Trnava
Slovak Cup: 2021–22

References

External links
 
 Spartak profile 
 Profile at LevskiSofia.info
 

1989 births
Living people
People from Trnava District
Sportspeople from the Trnava Region
Association football forwards
Slovak footballers
Slovakia international footballers
FC Spartak Trnava players
PFC Levski Sofia players
FC Viktoria Plzeň players
Górnik Zabrze players
Slovak Super Liga players
First Professional Football League (Bulgaria) players
Ekstraklasa players
Czech First League players
Association football midfielders
Expatriate footballers in Bulgaria
Expatriate footballers in Poland
Expatriate footballers in the Czech Republic
Slovak expatriate sportspeople in Bulgaria
Slovak expatriate sportspeople in Poland
Slovak expatriate sportspeople in the Czech Republic